WINTER LIVE 1981 is a live album by Yellow Magic Orchestra. It was recorded during the band's 1981 tour of Japan during the winter season of November and December 1981. A set of performances were first released in Betamax and VHS in 1983, featuring illustrations by Yakov Chernikhov. This is the only YMO live album from the BGM/Technodelic era of the group (three songs are included in the ONE MORE YMO compilation, but this remains the only full music album to do so); although this album only features one song that wasn't in either BGM or Technodelic ("Cosmic Surfin'" from Yellow Magic Orchestra), YMO also performed "Technopolis" and "Rydeen" (both from Solid State Survivor), as well as more songs from BGM and Technodelic ("Ballet", "Seoul Music" and "Key") and the unreleased "Loop".

Track listing

Personnel
Haruomi Hosono - Bass, Keyboards, Vocals
Ryuichi Sakamoto - Keyboards, Vocals, Drums, Megaphone
Yukihiro Takahashi - Drums, Percussion, Electronic drums, Vocals, Keyboards
Hideki Matsutake - Programming

External links

Yellow Magic Orchestra albums
Alfa Records live albums
1981 live albums